Christopher Davis Pritchett (born January 31, 1970) is an American former Major League Baseball (MLB) first baseman who played for the California/Anaheim Angels and Philadelphia Phillies between 1996 and 2000, and is currently a college baseball coach for the UBC Thunderbirds.

Amateur career
A native of Merced, California, Pritchett graduated from Central Catholic High School (Modesto, California) and is an alumnus of the University of California, Los Angeles. In 1990, he played collegiate summer baseball with the Harwich Mariners of the Cape Cod Baseball League.

Professional career
Drafted by the California Angels in the second round of the 1991 Major League Baseball draft, Pritchett made his Major League Baseball debut with the California Angels on September 6, 1996, and appeared in his final game on May 23, 2000.

Scouting and coaching career
Following his playing career, Pritchett was an international scout for the Boston Red Sox of Major League Baseball, assigned to Canada.

In 2015 he became the head coach of the UBC Thunderbirds baseball team, which competes in the National Association of Intercollegiate Athletics.

Personal
Pritchett has been married to Canadian voice actress and singer Saffron Henderson since 2001.

References

External links

1970 births
Living people
American expatriate baseball players in Canada
Anaheim Angels players
Baseball coaches from California
Baseball players from California
Boise Hawks players
Boston Red Sox scouts
California Angels players
Edmonton Trappers players
Harwich Mariners players
Iowa Cubs players
Major League Baseball first basemen
Midland Angels players
Nashville Sounds players
People from Merced, California
Philadelphia Phillies players
Quad Cities River Bandits players
Salt Lake Stingers players
Scranton/Wilkes-Barre Red Barons players
UCLA Bruins baseball players
Vancouver Canadians players